Danielle McCann is a Canadian politician, who was elected to the National Assembly of Quebec in the 2018 provincial election. She represents the electoral district of Sanguinet as a member of the Coalition Avenir Québec and is the former Minister of Health. She is the current Minister of Higher Education

After the Controversy over academic freedom at the University of Ottawa McCann as Minister of Higher Education pushed for Bill 32 an bill on Academic freedom in universities. which passed in June 2022. 
 
McCann's responsibilities as Minister of Health and Social Services included the COVID-19 pandemic in Quebec.

Electoral Record

Cabinet posts

References

Living people
Coalition Avenir Québec MNAs
Health ministers of Quebec
Members of the Executive Council of Quebec
21st-century Canadian politicians
Women government ministers of Canada
Women MNAs in Quebec
People from Montérégie
Year of birth missing (living people)
21st-century Canadian women politicians